Lạng Sơn station is a railway station in Vietnam. It serves the town of Lạng Sơn, in Lạng Sơn Province.

References

Buildings and structures in Lạng Sơn province
Railway stations in Vietnam